The Central Washington Wildcats program represents Central Washington University in college football at the NCAA Division II level. The Wildcats are normally members of the Great Northwest Athletic Conference, but when that conference dropped football after the 2021 season, they joined the Lone Star Conference as football-only members.

Conference affiliations
 1901–1922: Independent
 1923–1937: Tri-Normal League
 1938: Independent
 1939–1985: Evergreen Conference
 1985–1986: Columbia Football League
 1987–2000: Columbia Football Association
 2001–2005: Great Northwest Athletic Conference
 2006–2007: North Central Intercollegiate Athletic Conference
 2008–2021:  Great Northwest Athletic Conference
 2022–present: Lone Star Conference

Playoff appearances

NCAA Division II 
The Wildcats have made six appearances in the NCAA Division II playoffs, with a combined record of 3-6.

Stadium
The Central Washington Wildcats have played their home games at Tomlinson Stadium since its construction in 1959. The current permanent capacity of the stadium is 4,000.

Rivalries

Western Washington

Notable players

 Beau Baldwin
 Jon Kitna
 Mike Reilly
 John Zamberlin
 Adam Bighill
 Chase DeMoore

References

External links
 

 
American football teams established in 1901
1901 establishments in Washington (state)